Several ships of the Royal Navy has been named HMS Heron after the wading bird.

 , an 18-gun 340-ton sloop purchased June 1804 (and previously named Jason). Renamed HMS Volcano in 1810 following conversion to a bomb vessel. Sold on 28 August 1816.
 , a  originally to have been called HMS Rattlesnake and launched at Upnor, Kent on 22 October 1812, and broken up in March 1831.
 , a 482-ton 16-gun brig launched at Chatham Dockyard on 27 September 1847 and lost at sea off West Africa on 9 May 1859.
 , a wooden screw  launched at Miller's Shipyard, Liverpool on 5 July 1860 and broken up in Jamaica in 1881.
 , an 85-ton river gunboat equipped with two 2-pounder guns and constructed at Yarrow. Transferred to the Nigerian Government on 1 January 1899.
 HMS Heron was a 100-ton War Department tender originally called . Following her transfer to the Royal Navy in 1906 she was renamed Heron. Sold in September 1923.
 HMS Heron was assigned to a 1,200-ton sloop, but the vessel had been renamed  by the time of her launch in 1938.
HMS Heron II was a short-term resident at RNAS Haldon before moving to RNAS Charlton Horethorne during World War II. It closed in 1948.
HMS Heron (shore establishment) is the designation currently given to RNAS Yeovilton in Somerset, England

References

Royal Navy ship names